Luzula confusa is a species of rush belonging to the family Juncaceae.

Its native range is Subarctic to Northeastern USA.

References

confusa